The 1946 West Virginia State Yellow Jackets football team was an American football team that represented West Virginia State University as a member of the Colored Intercollegiate Athletic Association (CIAA) during the 1946 college football season. In their second season under head coach Mark Cardwell, the team compiled a 6–3–1 record and outscored opponents by a total of 177 to 105.

The Dickinson System rated West Virginia State as the No. 10 black college football team for 1946.

The team played its home games at Lakin Field in Institute, West Virginia.

Schedule

References

West Virginia State
West Virginia State Yellow Jackets football seasons
West Virginia State Yellow Jackets football